Roderick Mayne Thorp, Jr. (September 1, 1936 – April 28, 1999) was an American novelist specializing mainly in police procedural/crime novels. His novel The Detective was adapted into a film of the same name in 1968. Thorp is also better known for its sequel, the bestselling novel, Nothing Lasts Forever, which later served as the basis for the film Die Hard, thus Thorp became a creator of the entire media franchise of the same name. Two other Thorp novels, Rainbow Drive and Devlin, were also adapted into TV movies.

Life
Thorp was born in Bronx, New York City. As a young college graduate, Thorp worked at a detective agency owned by his father. He would later teach literature and lecture on creative writing at schools and universities in New Jersey and California, and also wrote articles for newspapers and magazines. Thorp died of a heart attack in Oxnard, California.

Novels
Into the Forest (1961)
The Detective (1966)
Dionysus (1969)
The Music of Their Laughter: An American Album (1970)
Wives: An Investigation (1971)
Slaves (1973)
The Circle of Love (1974)
Westfield (1977)
Nothing Lasts Forever (1979) (reissued as Die Hard)
Jenny and Barnum: A Novel of Love (1981)
Rainbow Drive (1986)
Devlin (1988)
River: A Novel of the Green River Killings (1995)

Filmography
The Detective (1968) (novel)
Die Hard (1988) (novel)
Rainbow Drive (1990) (book)
Devlin (1992) (book)
Deep Down (1994) (cast)

References

External links

Roderick Thorp at Goodreads

1936 births
1999 deaths
20th-century American male writers
20th-century American novelists
American crime fiction writers
American male novelists
People from the Bronx
Die Hard